20 em 1 (English translation: 20 in 1) is a compilation game from Tec Toy that allows players to choose from 20 different games. The title was exclusively released in Brazil as a pack-in game included with later revisions of the Master System.

Gameplay
Many of the included games belong to the action game genre while others are racing or sports games involving skateboarding, motocross racing, car racing/driving, roller skating, and skiing. Trophies are earned for beating each of the 20 games that are included in this compilation. The game has text that is in the Brazilian Portuguese language.

References

External links

1995 video games
Brazil-exclusive video games
Master System games
Master System-only games
Pack-in video games
Video games developed in Brazil

pt:20 em 1